is a Japanese professional footballer who plays as a midfielder for German club Bayern Munich II.

Career statistics

Club
.

Notes

References

External links

2004 births
Living people
Association football people from Kanagawa Prefecture
Japanese footballers
Japan youth international footballers
Association football midfielders
J1 League players
Sagan Tosu players